Coldspring Mountain is a mountain located in Yukon, Canada.

References 

One-thousanders of Yukon